Boyd Knight v Purdue [1999] 2 NZLR 278  is a cited case in New Zealand regarding liability for negligent misstatements

Background
After losing their investment of $750,000 in Burbery Mortgage Finance & Savings Ltd, the plaintiffs sued the auditors to recover their investment, on the basis that without their audit certificate, that under the Securities Act, there would not have been a prospectus, and so no investment in the first place.

In the High Court, they won their claim, albeit reduced by 50% due to contributory negligence due to the fact that it was a speculative investment in the first place.

The auditors appealed.

Held
The Court of Appeal reversed the High Courts award of damages, on the basis that the plaintiff's had admitted they had not read the advert as a "true and fair view" of the accounts.

References

Court of Appeal of New Zealand cases
New Zealand tort case law
1992 in case law
1992 in New Zealand law